Robert Rees (15 April 1882 – 20 September 1966) was an Australian cricketer. He played in thirteen first-class matches for South Australia between 1903 and 1913.

See also
 List of South Australian representative cricketers

References

External links
 

1882 births
1966 deaths
Australian cricketers
South Australia cricketers
Cricketers from Adelaide